The 1994 Austrian motorcycle Grand Prix was the fifth round of the 1994 Grand Prix motorcycle racing season. It took place on 22 May 1994 at the Salzburgring.

500cc classification

250cc classification

 Luis Carlos Maurel suffered a leg injury in a crash during practice and withdrew from the event.

125cc classification

 Tomoko Igata crashed in the final corner and suffered a broken leg which ruled her out of the next three rounds of the championship.

References

Austrian motorcycle Grand Prix
Austrian
Motorcycle Grand Prix